Teneguía is a monogenetic cinder cone – a volcanic vent which has been active once (in 1971) and has had further seismic activity. It is situated on the island of La Palma, one of the Canary Islands, and is located at the southern end of the sub-aerial section of the Cumbre Vieja volcano, of which Teneguía is just one of several vents.

1971 eruption
This vent was the source of a subaerial volcanic eruption in Spain, which occurred from October 26 to November 28, 1971.  
Earthquakes preceded the eruption. A tourist died as a result of severe intoxication caused by gas inhalation near the volcano after breaking the security cordon established to protect the population. The eruption caused some property damage to roads, crops, and homes. It also destroyed a beach, though a new one was later formed by natural means. Densely populated zones were not affected. The vent has since become an attraction for tourists and forms part of the Monumento Natural de Los Volcanes de Teneguía.

See also 
 2021 Cumbre Vieja volcanic eruption
 2011–12 El Hierro eruption
 1949 Cumbre Vieja eruption

References

Further reading

External links
 Film of the Teneguía eruption in 1971 (Noticiarios NO-DO: "Volcanes de la isla de La Palma") - by RTVE/Filmoteca Española, 15 November 1971.
 Photos of the Teneguía eruption in 1971 (Fotos de la erupción volcánica de Teneguía) – Instituto Geográfico Nacional

La Palma
Volcanoes of the Canary Islands
Monogenetic cinder cones